Río Grande is a town in the Puerto Plata province of the Dominican Republic.

Sources 
 https://web.archive.org/web/20081014155151/http://www.mialtamira.com/
 http://nona.net/features/map/placedetail.1526091/Boca%20de%20R%C3%ADo%20Grande/
  – World-Gazetteer.com

Populated places in Puerto Plata Province

Rio Grande es un Distrito Municipal de Altamira, provincia Puerto Plata. Este Distrito Municipal su actividad principal es la agricultura y la ganadería, su mayor actividad principal es el Cacao